TLC is a Southeast Asian pay television channel that was launched in June 2001 as Discovery Travel & Adventure. It was the third channel launched by Warner Bros. Discovery in the region. It was initially focused on providing travel-related entertainment.

On 1 January 2005, the channel was rebranded as Discovery Travel & Living and received new programming. This was part of a major action within Discovery International to focus on lifestyle programming. The new schedules featured many cooking programmes and makeover shows.

On 1 September 2010, the channel was rebranded again into TLC, with international and local lineups. The new channel was said to be "bigger, better and bolder, featuring new places, genres, and faces."

Programming

 1,000 Places to See Before You Die
 Amazing Eats
 Anthony Bourdain: The Layover
 Anthony Bourdain: No Reservations
 Armando's Asian Twist
 Around the World in 80 Plates
 Bazaar
 Cake Boss
 Chic Eats
 Fabulous Cakes
 The Flying Winemaker
 Fun Asia
 Fun Taiwan
 Fun Taiwan Challenge
 How To Cook Like Heston
 Island Feast With Peter Kuruvita
 Jamie's 15-Minute Meals
 Jamie's 30 Minute Meals
 Kitchen Boss
 Man v. Food Nation
 Mission Menu
 My Big Fat American Gypsy Wedding
 Now Boarding India
 The Originals with Emeril
 Project Accessory
 Samantha Brown: Passport To Latin America
 Take Home Chef
 "The Flying Winemaker"
 The World's Richest People
 World's Weirdest Restaurants

See also
 TLC (TV network)
 TLC (India)

References

External links
 TLC Asia
 

Asia
English-language television stations
Television channels and stations established in 2001

zh:TLC (電視頻道)